Leonel Héctor Peralta (born 9 July 1992) is an Argentine footballer.

Career

For the second half of 2014/15, Peralta signed for Costa Rican top flight side Alajuelense from General Paz Juniors in the Argentine fourth division.

In 2016, he suffered an injury which kept him out for a year. Saprissa, Costa Rica's most successful club, helped Peralta recover.

For the second half of 2019/20, he signed for Municipal Grecia in the Costa Rican top flight from Argentine fifth division team Argentino de Rosario.

References

External links
 

Argentine footballers
Living people
1992 births
Association football defenders
Footballers from Rosario, Santa Fe
General Paz Juniors footballers
L.D. Alajuelense footballers
Municipal Pérez Zeledón footballers
Argentino de Rosario footballers
Municipal Grecia players